Arad County Emergency Clinical Hospital (Romanian: Spitalul Clinic Județean de Urgență Arad) is a major hospital in Arad, Romania. The hospital serves the whole Arad County and neighboring counties. The hospital is a multipurpose facility with 1322 beds, being one of the largest hospitals in the country. It has departments that cover most branches of human medicine (including psychiatry or palleative care).

History

The first salons of the hospital were opened in 1775. At the time, Arad was in the Austro-Hungarian Empire, and therefore the hospital was partly operated by Hungarian staff. The original hospital was the actual Municipal Hospital, now part of the ACCH.

The hospital's history remains uncertain until the Second World War, when the hospital was being used as a military hospital, as Arad was not a huge target.

In the 1960s, the hospital was added an additional three floors, totaling five floors.

In the late 2000s, the hospital merged with the Arad Municipal Hospital (Romanian: Spitalul Municipal Arad), forming a hospital which not only treats patients from the municipality of Arad, but also from the county. This practice is done because in some parts of the county, the hospitals might not have the adequate equipment for certain procedures.

In 2011, the hospital received a new air ambulance, as well as a helipad.

In 2017, the local county council opened the new off-site pulmonology clinic after 4 years of construction. It is a 112-bed modern facility that houses the 3 pulmonology departments which were previously spread in old buildings across the city.

Facilities and equipment
There are 1322 hospital beds covering almost all medical specialities on a non-stop basis, with an average of 2-4 beds per room. The hospital has multiple operating theaters and 2 ICUs. As of 2013 the cardiology operates a new cath lab making coronary and peripheral catheterization possible. The radiology department features CT and MRI imaging techniques. The hospital also features an advanced trauma center, with a recently rebuilt emergency department, being the most modern in western Romania. Arad County Clinical Hospital also features a helipad and coordinates the regional air ambulance service (SMURD) which operates a Eurocopter EC135 medical helicopter.

Future
The local government plans on modernizing and expanding the hospital, however old infrastructure prevents it from being a true modern medical facility, thus building a new hospital from scratch in the near future has been deemed necessary.

A new oncology clinic is being built as of 2019 to replace the existing oncology department which functions in an inappropriate location.

References

Hospitals in Romania
Buildings and structures in Arad, Romania
Municipal hospitals